Player versus player (PvP) is a type of multiplayer interactive conflict within a game between human players. This is often compared to player versus environment (PvE), in which the game itself controls its players' opponents. The terms are most often used in games where both activities exist, particularly MMORPGs, MUDs, and other role-playing video games, to distinguish between gamemodes. PvP can be broadly used to describe any game, or aspect of a game, where players compete against each other. PvP is often controversial when used in role-playing games. In most cases, there are vast differences in abilities between players. PvP can even encourage experienced players to immediately attack and kill inexperienced players. PvP is often referred to as player killing in the cases of games which contain, but do not focus on, such interaction.

History
PvP combat in CRPGs has its roots in various MUDs like Gemstone II and Avalon: The Legend Lives.. However, while the ability to kill another player existed in many MUDs, it was usually frowned upon because of general strict adherences and heavy influences from tabletop role-playing games such as Dungeons & Dragons. The term PvP originated in text based MUDs played on bulletin board systems like MajorMUD and Usurper. These games had open worlds where any player could attack any other player as long as they were not at a safe spot in town like the Bank. Player versus player was coined sometime in the late 1980s to refer to the combat between players that resulted in the loser being penalized in some way.

The first graphical MMORPG was Neverwinter Nights, which began development in 1989 and ran on AOL 1991–1997, and which included PvP. PvP was initially limited to magical attacks in the game. Later modifications expanded its use to limited areas so that players who wished to avoid it could do so. Much of the PvP activity was coordinated events by the game's guilds, which were the first such organized user groups in MMORPGs.

Genocide, an LPMud launched in 1992, was a pioneer in PvP conflict as the first "pure PK" MUD, removing all non-PvP gameplay and discarding the RPG-style character development normally found in MUDs in favor of placing characters on an even footing, with only player skill providing an advantage. Extremely popular, its ideas influenced the MUD world heavily.

Other early MMORPGs, including Meridian 59 (1996), Ultima Online (1997), and Tibia (1997) also had PvP combat as a feature. In Ultima Online, the goal was to allow players to police themselves in a "frontier justice" way. This system also exists in Tibia, where death includes significant penalty, and killing someone inflicts considerable harm to their character. In Meridian 59, the game tried to focus PvP by having different political factions for players to join. The later Eve Online (2003) refined Ultima Onlines original approach of "PvP anywhere but in town" (where attacking another player is dangerous in and around towns due to interference from NPC "guards"). However, these games tended to be unfriendly to more casual players. With the popularity of EverQuest in 1999, primarily consisting of PvE elements (with the exception of limited PvP on one specific server), PvP became a negative for some newer/casual MMORPG players and developers looking to draw a larger crowd. In 2000, in response to complaints about malicious player-killers, Ultima Online controversially added an extra copy of the game world to each server in which open PvP was disabled.

In addition to this, not all PvP games feature a player's avatar experiencing death. An example of this type of PvP element can be found on MMOs such as Audition Online (2004) where while players are not directly killing each other's avatars as traditionally found in MMOs, they are still competing against each other during certain game modes in a Player versus Player setting.

PvP has been included in other games such as Asheron's Call in late 1999, Diablo II in 2000, Dark Age of Camelot and RuneScape in 2001, Asheron's Call 2 in 2002, Shadowbane in 2003, and Dragon Nest in 2011. While these games included PvP, they still contained large portions of prerequisite PvE, mostly to build characters.

DOOM was one of the most influential instances of PvP, coining the term "Deathmatch". This MMO-esque mode helped inspire the now-iconic PvP modes found in the FPS genre, such as battle royale and team deathmatch while popularizing PvP as a whole.

Classifications
Player KillingPlayer killing, or PKing, is unrestricted PvP resulting in a character's death. Some games offer open PvP (also sometimes called world PvP), where one player can attack another without warning anywhere in the game world. A pure PK game is one where PvP conflict is the only gameplay offered. Ganking (short for gang killing) is a type of PKing in which the killer has a significant advantage over his victim, such as being part of a group, being a higher level, or attacking the victim while they are at low health.

PvP can also create additional facets in the community. In Ultima Online and Asheron's Call, a rift formed between those who enjoyed PKing, those who enjoyed hunting the PKs and those who simply did not want to fight at all. The Renaissance expansion later added a Trammel facet where PvP was not allowed, giving some out to the UO crowd that did not wish to engage in PvP at all. Asheron's Call contained a server that was completely unrestricted in player interactions where massive "PK" and "Anti (PK)" dynasties formed.

Character death in an online game usually comes with a penalty (though some games remove it from PvP combat), so habitual PKers can find themselves ostracized by the local community. In some games a character will die many times and the player must often sacrifice some experience points (XP) or in-game currency to restore that character to life. Permanent death (such that the player must create a new character) is relatively uncommon in online games, especially if PKing is permitted. An example of such a mode is Hardcore mode on the game Diablo II.

Anti-Player Killing
Anti-PKing, also known as Player Killer Killing, PK Killing, or PKK''', is a form of in-game player justice. Often motivated by an overpopulation of in-game player killers, vigilante Anti-PKs hunt Player Killers and Player Griefers with vengeance.

Some players, known as "friendlies", choose to befriend other players with pacifism. Voice chat or in-game emotes are often utilized to demonstrate peacefulness and keep others from attacking.

Dueling
Dueling is both voluntary and competitive. Dueling ladders and leagues set up by fans are common for most MMORPGs that have PvP. Dark Age of Camelot was the first graphical MMORPG to debut a formal dueling system in-game (Ballista); other MMORPGs such as City of Heroes, Anarchy Online, World of Warcraft, Guild Wars, Lineage 2, Wurm Online, and RuneScape feature PvP as competitive dueling in a group setting.

Flagging
Through various means, "flags" can be turned on or off, allowing PvP combat with other people who have also turned on their flag. In Everquest, there is no way to turn the flag off once it has been turned on. In Star Wars Galaxies, the flag may be turned off by interacting with faction specific NPCs located throughout the game or by typing an in-game command (/pvp). In World of Warcraft, flagging is selectable or can be activated by attacking certain flagged players until a cool-off period ends, though this can be exploited by griefers via corpse camping. Some games have a bounty system where players that kill or heal other players open themselves up to being killed in return. This is sometimes called the "revenge flag". Use of this 'bounty' system is not standardized among MMORPGs, and there are debates raging about how to 'police' the system to avoid abuse.

Sometimes the PvP flag gets automatically 'ON' on any player who initiates a PK. Other players who attacks a player who has the PvP flag on will NOT get their PvP flag 'ON'.

RvR (realm versus realm) combat

In 2001, Mythic Entertainment introduced a new team-based form of PvP combat with the release of Dark Age of Camelot. In RvR, players of each realm team up to fight against players from the opposing realms in team-based combat. This can include normal skirmishes between rival groups that is common in other PvP systems, but also consists of objective-based battles such as taking and holding keeps or capturing enemy relics.

This was a new concept to graphical MMORPGs, but was first introduced in the game that preceded DAoC, Darkness Falls: The Crusade, which has since been shut down in favor of building on DAoC. Other MMORPG games now also feature this type of gameplay.

 PvP in tabletop role-playing games 

Tabletop role-playing games (RPGs) have also often featured PvP action. These are usually considered a reasonable part of play so long as the fight is based on "in-character" reasons. Games are often written to balance playable characters, ensuring that the players are able to pick their favorite characters rather than being forced into a metagame to succeed.

This approach to PvP in tabletop games is not universal. For example, in the highly satirical Paranoia'', lethal PvP conflict is a core game element, considered normal and heavily encouraged by the rules and support materials.

Ethical issues 
Player-vs-player dynamics involve ethical issues with players. Because of ganking, some game developers view PvP with contempt. Despite the advantage experienced players have over new players, many game developers have assumed an honor code would prevent PKing.

See also
Deathmatch
Last man standing (video games)
Player versus environment

References

Esports terminology
MUD terminology
Role-playing game terminology
Video game gameplay
Video game terminology
Video game culture